A list of fantasy films released in the 1990s.

List

Notes

References
 

1990s
Fantasy